Gangjin-eup is an administrative division of Gangjin county, South Jeolla Province, South Korea.  As with much of Gangjin county, Gangjin-eup is largely agricultural and known for its rice, tomato, and persimmon harvests.  

It is the county seat, with a population of roughly 16,600 people, comprising roughly 6,000 families.  There are 4 elementary schools, 2 middle schools, and several high schools.  

Gangjin county is known as a center for the production of Goryeo celadon, traditional Korean pottery.  Gangjin county is also home to several temples, and Gangjin-eup itself holds the birthplace of Yeongrang Kim Yun-sik, a well-known Korean poet of the 1930s and 1940s.  

There is a monument to 17th-century Dutch explorer Hendrick Hamel, the first westerner to experience and write about Korea's Joseon Dynasty era.  Hamel and his men were shipwrecked on Jeju island, and they remained captives in Korea for 13 years. Now this city in Korea is sister cities with Snoqualmie, Washington, U.S.A.

Places of interest
Boeunsan, 
Geumgoksa

References

External links 
 Gangjin County website
 List of celadon National Properties in Gangjin

Towns and townships in South Jeolla Province
Gangjin County
Populated places established in 1937